The 2007 NAB AFL Under 18 Championships was the 12th edition of the AFL Under 18 Championships. Eight teams competed in the championships: Vic Metro, Vic Country, South Australia and Western Australia in Division 1, and New South Wales/Australian Capital Territory (NSW/ACT), Northern Territory, Queensland and Tasmania in Division 2. The competition was played over three rounds across two divisions. Western Australia and New South Wales/Australian Capital Territory (NSW/ACT) were the Division 1 and Division 2 champions, respectively. The Larke Medal (for the best player in Division 1) was awarded to Western Australia's Cale Morton, and the Hunter Harrison Medal (for the best player in Division 2) was won by NSW/ACT midfielder Craig Bird.

Results

Division 1

Division 1 Ladder

Division 2

Division 2 Ladder

Under 18 All-Australian team
The 2007 Under 18 All-Australian team was named on 11 July 2007:

References

Under 18